This article contains a list of named passenger trains in Pakistan.

See also
 Pakistan Railways

References

External links

Pakistan